Dwight Arthur Hauser (July 4, 1911 – January 18, 1969) was an American film screenwriter, actor and film producer, also the father of actor Wings Hauser and grandfather of actors Cole Hauser and Erich Hauser.

Death
Hauser died on January 18, 1969, in Lake Sherwood, California at the age of 57.

Filmography

Writer
Disneyland (1961–1964) (TV series) (3 episodes)
Nikki, Wild Dog of the North: Part 1 (1964) TV Episode (writer)
Nikki, Wild Dog of the North: Part 2 (1964) TV Episode (writer)
A Fire Called Jeremiah (1961) TV Episode
The Legend of Lobo (1962)Disney
People and Places (1962) (TV series) (unknown episodes)
Nikki, Wild Dog of the North (1961)
Wales (1958) (short film)
Nature's Strangest Creatures (1959) (narrative)
Ama Girls (1958) Academy Award for Walt Disney
Lapland (1957)
Portugal (1957/I)
Lassie (TV Series) (writer - 4 episodes, 1962 - 1963) (teleplay - 1 episode, 1961) 
Weasel Warfare (1963) ... (writer) 
Gentle Savage (1962) ... (writer) 
Quick Brown Fox (1962) ... (writer) 
The Musher (1962) ... (writer) 
The Badger Game (1961) ... (teleplay)

References

External links
 

1911 births
1969 deaths
Male actors from California
American male film actors
American film producers
American male screenwriters
Male actors from Idaho
Writers from Idaho
20th-century American male actors
20th-century American businesspeople
Screenwriters from California
Screenwriters from Idaho
20th-century American male writers
20th-century American screenwriters